Rykestrasse Synagogue, Germany's largest synagogue, is located in the Prenzlauer Berg neighbourhood in the Pankow borough of Berlin.  built the synagogue in 1903/1904. It was inaugurated on 4 September 1904, in time for the holidays of and around Rosh Hashanah. The synagogue stands off the street alignment and is reached by a thoroughfare in the pertaining front building.

The years 1902 to 1933
, comprising the bulk of Jewish faithful of mainstream (also called liberal, in today's English terminology 'conservative'), Orthodox and Reform affiliation, grew strongly in membership in the second half of the 19th century. With the expansion of Berlin into new neighbourhoods, the need of additional synagogues within a walking distance became urgent. However, the Jewish community could not fulfill all the claims for additional premises, so many private synagogues (Vereinssynagogen, literally synagogues of registered associations) emerged scattered over the city. Most Jews in Prenzlauer Berg, however, could not afford to establish a Vereinssynagoge with their own funds.

Construction started in 1903, and at noon on Sunday, 4 September 1904, the synagogue was inaugurated with Handel's prelude in D major and the Ma Tovu prayer led by cantor David Stabinski (1857–1919), Rabbi  (1848–1916, illuminating the ner tamid) and Rabbi Adolf Rosenzweig (1850–1918) preaching.

In the afternoon of the same day, Berlin's other Jewish community , solely comprising Orthodox members, opened its own synagogue in Artilleriestraße, today's Tucholskystraße. Five days later on the eve of Rosh haShana the Rykestraße Synagogue was first time used for its actual religious purpose.

With its members of different Jewish affiliations, the Jüdische Gemeinde zu Berlin also offered services in its different synagogues following different ceremonial styles. Some followed old style (Alter Ritus), such as the Old Synagogue on Heidereutergasse 4, especially for the members clinging to the so-called intra-community orthodoxy (Gemeindeorthodoxie, as opposed to seceded orthodoxy [Austrittsorthodoxie], the proponents of which had seceded from Jüdische Gemeinde zu Berlin establishing Adass Jisroel in 1869).

Other synagogues applied the new style (Neuer Ritus), often including organ music, (mixed) choirs and additional songs sung in German language.

Each synagogue of Jüdische Gemeinde zu Berlin had its own elected Synagogenvorstand (board of gabba'im), which developed synagogal minhagim including their own peculiarities. Rykestraße Synagogue adopted a compromise minhag close to Alter Ritus. Thus rabbis of mainstream and Orthodox affiliation served the congregants.

The gabba'im decided to allow women and men sitting side by side, despite criticism from some Orthodox members. In this the synagogue equalled the practice in Lützowstraße Synagogue. The plan to install an organ – as realised in Berlin's New Synagogue in 1861 – was given up after a hefty debate. The space in the prayer hall prepared for the organ remained empty.

In 1904, the Jüdische Gemeinde zu Berlin opened a Jewish religious school (VI. Religionsschule) in the front building. During World War I Jüdische Gemeinde zu Berlin engaged Rabbi Martin Joseph as chaplain for Jewish Russian prisoners of war kept in detention centres at Berlin. On the high holidays the German High Command allowed them to attend services in Rykestraße Synagogue.

Joseph Himmel (1872–1943, Theresienstadt) served as president of the gabba'im in the 1910s probably until the 1920s. Orthodox Rabbi Siegfried Alexander (1886–1943, Auschwitz) won the congregants to elect the first woman, Martha Ehrlich (née Eisenhardt; 1896–1942) as gabba'i, equally participating in gabba'i decisions and tasks, however, except of – unlike her male colleagues – calling congregants up to read the Torah. In the 1930s until the closure of the synagogue in 1940, Josef Luster (1886–1943, Auschwitz) presided the board of gabba'im.

In 1922 a private School Association opened a Jewish school in the front building. The synagogue served the congregants in the Prenzlauer Berg neighbourhood as place of worship and for their rites of passage such as weddings and Bar Mitzvah ceremonies as well as Bat Mitzvah ceremonies starting as of the mid-1920s. On Yom Kippur ceremonies the prayer of Kol Nidrei was skipped, as was typical for Neuer Ritus style. However, this was protested in the 1920s by a group of congregants, the so-called Kol Nidrei demonstrators, who ostentatiously left the main prayer hall shortly before the service on the eve of Yom Kippur and then formed a minyan in the hallway, praying Kol Nidrei there, before returning again to the main hall.

The Israelitisches Familienblatt dedicated an article to the 25th anniversary of the inauguration of the Synagogue, while the gabba'im decided to celebrate a special ceremony on Sunday, 29 September 1929.

Some congregants formed a registered association for the Rykestraße Synagogue (Synagogenverein Rykestraße), promoting strong company among the congregants, organising meetings, festivities, lectures to this end, cherishing Jewish traditions and collecting and donating money for needy congregants (Tzedakah), but also demanding a say at employing rabbis and cantors. In 1931 Hugo Alexander presided over the association.

In January 1933, Sally Heilbrunn,  (1869–1951, Tel Aviv) and Rabbi Moritz Freier gathered 300 people protesting the replacement of Michael Sachs' Rödelheim siddur (Siddur Sefat Emet סדור ספת אמת) and machzor by the Berlin unitary siddur and machzor (Einheitsgebetsbuch). On 25 January the same year Synagogenverein gathered for a lecture and made the case for unitary siddur and machzor, denying aiming at Reform but at restoring the minhag as it used to be until by 1928, claiming that most congregants disliked the traditionalist changes since. In the end the protesters prevailed and the Rödelheim siddur and machzor remained in use in Rykestraße Synagogue until today.

The synagogue during Nazi rule
The upcoming Nazi dictatorship with its anti-Semitic discrimination, invidiousnesses, persecutions, and atrocities changed the lives of German Jewry so thoroughly that disputes on style and traditions fell silent. After the new Nazi government had widely banned Jewish performers, artists and scientists from public stages and lecterns, Rykestraße Synagogue opened for their concerts and lectures organised by Kulturbund Deutscher Juden or benefit performances by Jüdisches Winterhilfswerk (Jewish winter aid endowment) in favour of poor Jews, who had been excluded from government benefits.

On 16 February 1934, the synagogue choir under Kurt Burchard (1877–1942, Auschwitz) enacted for the first time the new Friday night liturgy that had been composed by Jakob Dymont (1881–1956), choirmaster at Adass Jisroel synagogue. Also Dymont's Shabbat morning liturgy was presented in the synagogue. For the 30th anniversary of the synagogue, Rudolf Melnitz reported in Israelitisches Familienblatt that the synagogue had attracted more people and that, with Orthodox and mainstream rabbis officiating, Rykestraße congregation enjoyed a unique richness.

The synagogue did not burn during the November Pogrom, then euphemised as "Kristallnacht" (Night of Broken Glass) on 9 November 1938, when Nazis attacked in well organised pogroms synagogues and Jewish businesses. Instead the Nazis ordered – as in other comparable sites too – a "mere" vandalisation and destruction of furnishings, since the synagogue is located within a block of residential buildings. A fire ignited and burning torah scrolls and smashed furniture was soon extinguished before spreading to the actual building. Many windows had been destroyed. Rabbis and other male congregants were arrested and taken to Sachsenhausen concentration camp.

Jüdische Gemeinde zu Berlin mended the synagogue, one of the few little-destroyed ones in Berlin, and reopened it on the eve of Pessach 1939 (3 April). Regular Jewish ceremonies could be held until, on 12 April 1940, Jüdisches Nachrichtenblatt announced that services would not held be any more in Rykestraße and in the also reopened New Synagogue until further notice. That was the usual way in which Nazi prohibitions were publicised.

The Jewish school in the front building was forced to close in 1941. However, the Jewish community formally remained proprietor of the site. In May 1942 the borough of Prenzlauer Berg declared its will to acquire the site paying the ridiculous sum of reichsmark (ℛℳ) 191,860 and with effect of 1 September 1944 the site was conveyanced to the borough. When on 6 May 1943 the Jewish community applied at the Gestapo for a sale permission, since all its property was under custodianship as were any sales proceeds, it named the Heeresstandortverwaltung I Berlin (German Army garrison administration no. I) as the tenant of all the site, except of two little apartments in the front building still rented out to residential tenants.

The oft-mentioned usage of the synagogue by the Wehrmacht as a horse barn is not proven and unlikely. There were no premises and remainders found in the synagogue indicating that usage. Instead it is reported that furniture was stored in the prayer hall. The furnishings (chandeliers, lustres, menorot, ner tamid, cupper coverings of doors) of the synagogue made from non-ferrous metal, which was scarce and much needed for war production, were not dismantled.

Post-war
The prayer hall lacked most of its benches, and the aron kodesh was screened off by a raw provisional wall built after April 1940. Sanitary installations had been dismantled and the destroyed windows exposed the interior to the impact of weather.  (1899–1950, Soviet Gulag), who survived the Shoah living underground, the new president of Jüdische Gemeinde zu Berlin much promoted the reopening of Rykestraße Synagogue. He informed the city council that on Friday, 13 July 1945, the first shabbat ceremony was held, also attended by Soviet City Commander Nikolai Berzarin, however using the better preserved and smaller weekday prayer hall. On 29 July 1945 Rabbi  could celebrate the first Jewish wedding there since the closure of the synagogue in 1940. Jewish displaced persons, who survived the Shoa and were stranded in Berlin, used to live in the front building.

The great prayer hall was provisionally refurnished with benches. A new central bimah replaced the original one located directly in front of the aron qodesh and thus also screened off by the wall. Services were held on Rosh Hashana 1945 and Pessach 1946, before another closure for a more serious refurbish 1946/1947.

In the period of GDR
 In 1952 Heinz Galinski, since 1949 president of still undivided Jüdische Gemeinde zu Berlin, commissioned Heinz Juliusberger, head of its construction department, to prepare and supervise an extensive renovation of the synagogue, being the sole functioning synagogue in the eastern sector of Berlin. Material unavailable in the communist planning system, such as zinc to repair the roof, were bought in West Berlin and brought over. The provisional wall was demolished reopening the access to the aron qodesh and the original bimah, so that the central bimah, disliked by Riesenburger, could be removed again.

During the course of the anti-Semitic campaigns in Czechoslovakia during the Slánský trial, GDR authorities arrested and interrogated Jews living in East Germany. The Stasi searched community offices all over the GDR, leading to renewed exodus from the GDR by Jews. West Berlin permitted these migrants and within several months, between 500 and 600 Jews crossed over.

Berlin's Chief Rabbi  then urged Galinski, who rather maintained a low political profile after the Soviets had deported his predecessor, to warn Jews in the east of the upcoming persecution, which he did by way of a press conference held in West Berlin. Communist Volkskammer deputy  (1909–1979), president of the union of Jewish congregations in East Germany (not including Jüdische Gemeinde zu Berlin), was interrogated between 6 and 8 January, when GDR officials prompted him to declare in the name of the Jewish community that there is no anti-Semitism in communist states, that Israel is a fascist state and that he acknowledges the Slánský trial. Meyer refused and fled to West Berlin in the night after the Doctors' plot started on 13 January 1953.

Hoping to spare themselves from further persecution, members of Jüdische Gemeinde zu Berlin in East Berlin formed a new provisional executive board only competent for the eastern sector on 21 January, thus establishing Jüdische Gemeinde von Groß-Berlin (i.e. Jewish congregation of Greater Berlin), dividing Berlin's Jewish community. Rykestraße congregant Georg Heilbrunn (1887–1971; brother of the aforementioned Sally Heilbrunn), president of the Rykestraße gabba'im, was elected member of the East Berlin community board. On 25 January the GDR started a wave of arrests of Jews.

So there were Jüdische Gemeinde zu Berlin and Jüdische Gemeinde von Groß-Berlin, one western one eastern, when Riesenburger re-inaugurated Rykestraße Synagogue on Sunday, 30 August 1953, giving it the name "Friedenstempel"( English: Temple of Peace). Georg Heilbrunn and Israel Rothmann held speeches, the latter praising the great Soviet Union and the GDR government. The latter sent Arnold Zweig and Robert Havemann as its representatives. However, an arson attack on the day before cast a pall on the re-inauguration. The naming "Friedenstempel" did not prevail.

 Further repairs followed in 1957, 1967, but funds for houses of worship were in short supply from an atheistic government. After the erection of the Berlin Wall the number of members of the Jewish community in the eastern sector of Berlin amounted to about 3,000 persons.

On Sunday, 11 March 1962, Rabbi Riesenburger, who was also an organist, inaugurated an organ installed for the first time in the preserved location, which he played in concerts of traditional Berlin synagogal organ music. Still in use today, this instrument, a single keyboarded church organ of famous  (Frankfurt upon Oder) is used sometimes for concerts and some religious services as wedding ceremonies.

On Tuesday, 1 September 1964, Jüdische Gemeinde von Groß-Berlin celebrated the 60th anniversary of the Synagogue. After his death in 1965 Riesenburger was succeeded by Rabbi Ödön Singer. After he returned to Hungary in 1969 the position remained vacant.

On 21 September 1976 East Berlin registered Rykestraße Synagogue as a monument, so public subsidies flowed for the renovations in 1986/1987. On Rosh haShana 1987 (23 September) Isaac Newman assumed his office as rabbi for Jüdische Gemeinde von Berlin (after 1970 the Groß had been skipped). However, congregation and rabbi were disappointed of each other so Newman returned to the United States in May 1988. On 25 February 1988 the GDR government reversed the property transfer of 1944, thus Jüdische Gemeinde von Berlin (East) held again property title to the Synagogue. However, as the long practice showed since 1945, it was not the property title, anyway discretionarily not respected by the communist East German rulers, which allows the de facto usage, but usage depended on the pure goodwill of the rulers. By 1990 the community counted a mere 200 members and had no longer had a rabbi. On 1 January 1991 the small Jüdische Gemeinde von Berlin (East) and the much bigger Jüdische Gemeinde zu Berlin (West) reunited.

After unification
On 12 September 2004, the centenary of Rykestrasse synagogue was solemnly celebrated, cantor Jochen Fahlenkamp singing "Adoshem Malach" by former Rykestrasse choir conductor and composer Jakob Dymont (1860–1956).

The synagogue's interior, which now seats up to 1,074 people, originally sat 2,000. After more than a year of work to restore its prewar splendor, it was rededicated on 31 August 2007, this time as an Orthodox synagogue, with separate seating and an Orthodox Minyan. The inauguration saw rabbis bringing the Torah to the synagogue, in a ceremony witnessed by political leaders and Holocaust survivors from around the world.

"It is now the most beautiful synagogue in Germany," the cultural affairs director of the Jüdische Gemeinde zu Berlin, Peter Sauerbaum, said.

Today, Berlin has the largest Jewish community in Germany, with 12,000 registered members and eight synagogues.

Visiting the synagogue
Public tours through the Rykestrasse Synagogue are available on Thursdays between 14:00 and 18:00 and Sundays between 11:00 and 16:00. Tours are offered in German; an English tour starts at 16:00 on Thursdays. Entry is permitted until 17:30 pm and no entry is permitted at any other time.

Services are held on Friday nights and Saturday mornings.

The Synagogue can easily be accessed by public transport through the underground line U2 (stations Senefelderplatz and Eberswalder Strasse) and the tramway line M2 (stations Knaackstrasse and Marienburger Strasse).

List of rabbis serving at Rykestraße Synagogue
Since the archives of Jüdische Gemeinde zu Berlin were mostly destroyed following the compulsory dissolution of the community by the Nazi government exact years of office cannot be given. The rabbis also alternately served at other synagogues of Jüdische Gemeinde, some restricting themselves to only Alter Ritus or Neuer Ritus synagogues, some serving wherever the gabba'im invited them. 

 Siegmund Maybaum (1844–1919; mainstream)
  (1843–1919; mainstream)
  (1871–1921; mainstream)
  (1848–1916; Orthodox)
 Siegfried Alexander (1886–1943, Auschwitz; Orthodox)
 Moritz Freier (1889–1969; Orthodox)
 Ezechiel Landau (1888–1965; Orthodox)
  (1876–1949; Orthodox)
 Israel Nobel (1878–1962; Orthodox)
 Markus Petuchowski (1866–1926; Orthodox)
 Max Weyl (17 February 1873 – 27 September 1942, deported to Theresienstadt in 1942; graduate of Rabbinerseminar für das Orthodoxe Judentum, however mainstream), tutoring the world's first female Rabbi Regina Jonas.
 Manfred Swarsensky (1906–1981; mainstream)
 no services at Rykestraße Synagogue between April 1940 and July 1945
  (1896–1965), officiated since July 1945 till his death
 Ödön Singer, officiated 1965–1969
 vacancy 1969–1987
 Isaac Newman (b. 1923), officiated September 1987 till May 1988
 vacancy 1988–1990
 rabbis of Jüdische Gemeinde zu Berlin, reunited since 1 January 1991

List of cantors serving at Rykestraße Synagogue

 David Stabinski, succeeded by
 Max Sacher (1863–?), succeeded by
 Leo Juda Leib Ahlbeck (1880–?, emigrated to Britain in 1939), succeeded by
 Joseph Schallamach (b. 1907, emigrated to Shanghai), also serving as shammes
 no services at Rykestraße Synagogue between April 1940 and July 1945
 Paul Hecht (1897–?, emigrated by 1953 to the USA)
 Moritz Spitzer (1885–1964)
 Alfred Scheidemann (1905–1972)
 Sally Simoni (1905–1989)
  (b. 1928), officiating since Pessach 1966
 Jochen Fahlenkamp (1953–), officiating since 1998

Cantors on weekdays before 1940:
Salomon Blaustein (1847–1933) and Bernhard Kassel

References
Georg Dehio. Handbuch der deutschen Kunstdenkmäler: Berlin, Ernst Gall (ed.), Sibylle Badstübner-Gröger, Michael Bollé, Ralph Paschke (collaborators) et al., Munich: Deutscher Kunstverlag, 2000, . 
,  with Heinz Knobloch and Elke Nord, Jüdische Orte in Berlin, Berlin: Nicolai, 1996, pp. 38seq. 
Hermann Simon, Die Synagoge Rykestraße (1904–2004), Berlin: Hentrich & Hentrich and Stiftung Neue Synagoge Berlin / Centrum Judaicum, 2004, (Jüdische Miniaturen; vol. 17), 63 pages. 
Zeugnisse jüdischer Kultur: Erinnerungsstätten in Mecklenburg-Vorpommern, Brandenburg, Berlin, Sachsen-Anhalt, Sachsen und Thüringen , Klaus Arlt, Ingrid Ehlers (eds.), Constantin Beyer (photos) et al., Berlin: Tourist-Verlag and Wichern-Verlag, 1992, pp. 144seq.

References

External links

In pictures: Germany's biggest synagogue
Germany's biggest synagogue reopening

Ashkenazi Jewish culture in Berlin
Ashkenazi synagogues
Conservative Judaism in Germany
Romanesque Revival synagogues
Jewish German history
Heritage sites in Berlin
Synagogues in Berlin
Buildings and structures in Pankow
Synagogues completed in 1904
Rundbogenstil synagogues
Conservative synagogues